Carl Wolff may refer to:

 Carl Gustaf Wolff (1800–1868), Finnish shipowner and businessman
 Carl Heinz Wolff (1884–1942), German screenwriter, producer and film director